Henry George Walters (6 November 1917 – 25 August 1944) was a New Zealand cricketer. He was a left-handed batsman who played for Auckland. He was born in Auckland and died during World War II in the English Channel when serving as a Flight Sergeant with the Royal New Zealand Air Force.

Walters made a single first-class appearance for the team, during the 1941–42 season, against Wellington. From the opening order, he scored 81 runs in the first innings in which he batted, and 39 runs in the second, as Auckland won the match by a comfortable margin.

See also
 List of Auckland representative cricketers
 List of cricketers who were killed during military service

References

External links
Henry Walters at Cricket Archive

1917 births
1944 deaths
New Zealand cricketers
Auckland cricketers
New Zealand military personnel killed in World War II
Royal New Zealand Air Force personnel
Cricketers from Auckland